Shults Peninsula is a bold, mainly ice-covered peninsula, 10 miles (16 km) long and 5 miles (8 km) wide, at the east side of the mouth of Skelton Glacier to the south of Victoria Land. It was mapped by the United States Geological Survey (USGS) from ground surveys and Navy air photos, and named by Advisory Committee on Antarctic Names (US-ACAN) for Captain Roy G. Shults, U.S. Navy, Chief of Staff to the Commander, U.S. Naval Support Force, Antarctica, 1962 and 1963.

See also
Alpha Bluff, on the west side of Shults Peninsula

References

External links

Peninsulas of Antarctica
Landforms of the Ross Dependency
Hillary Coast